Heino Ferch (born 18 August 1963) is a German film, theatre and television actor. His notable film roles include Albert Speer in Downfall (2004) and Harry Melchior in The Tunnel (2001).

Biography
The son of a merchant sea captain, Heino Ferch was on stage at the age of 15, while still attending grammar school. As a member of the stage ballet company in the musical Can-Can, he performed the tumbling acrobatics at the Stadttheater Bremerhaven in his home town. During this time, he also traveled through Europe as a federal member of the National League of Gymnastics.

Ferch studied acting at the University of Music and Performing Arts "Mozarteum" in Salzburg, Austria. He graduated in 1987. In addition to his main subject, drama, he also took courses in tap dancing, ballet, and singing.

Between 1987 and 2006, Ferch lived in Berlin, a city whose division after World War II and reunification in 1989 is repeatedly reflected in his work as a movie actor (The Tunnel, Mord am Meer, The Airlift, The Wall - Berlin 1961 and The Miracle of Berlin). After his wedding in 2005, he moved his main residence to Bavaria.
 
Until 1999, he was in a nine-year relationship with actress Suzanne von Borsody but in 2000 he met Dr. Julia von Pufendorf, the daughter of the former under-secretary of state for cultural affairs for the city of Berlin. From this relationship, he fathered a daughter (Louisa, born 2000).

In 2002, Ferch met Marie-Jeanette Steinle, a National League Member of the military eventing squad, at the Bavarian Television Award celebration.

Three years later, in 2005, Ferch and Steinle married during the world's biggest sailing ship unification event, Sail 2005. The ceremony took place in the captain's lounge of the three-mast sailing ship Dar Młodzieży in Bremerhaven. A church wedding followed ten days later in Munster St. Maria Ascension in Dießen, Bavarian Ammersee. On 10 November 2008 Marie-Jeanette and Heino Ferch became parents to a daughter named Ava Vittoria Mercedès. The couple also became parents to a boy, Gustav Theo Cian on 4 November 2013.

The couple are highly active in polo sports - as players and in the promotion to the young. Both have DPV-Handicap of 0 (season 2010).

Ferch can speak German and English fluently, as well as some French.

Work

Theatre
Ferch's first job after completing his studies was at the Freie Volksbühne Berlin. He was an ensemble player from 1987 to 1990, under the direction of Hans Neuenfels amongst others.
 
From 1990 to 1994 he was ensemble player at the Schiller Theatre, Berlin (Die Räuber; Mockinpott; Kasimir und Karoline; As you like it - director: Katharina Thalbach).

In 1992 he appeared at the Theater des Westens in Der Blaue Engel (screenplay after a novel by Heinrich Mann) under the direction of Peter Zadek.

He also appeared as guest actor at the Salzburg Festival (Un re in ascolto; Jedermann; Macbeth; Il ritorno d´Ulisse), at the Scala Milan and at the Burgtheater Vienna (Die Geisel).

Film

In 1994 he followed among many others works, a part in the notable TV-mini production Deutschlandlied (directed by Tom Toelle) where he played the part of Hanno Schmidbauer, a young cabinet maker at the end of World War II.

In 1996 he appeared as Napola-Commander Obersturmbannfuehrer Raufeisen in The Ogre (quote by Oscar award winner, director Volker Schloendorff: "…the young sympathetic social climber Raufeisen, wonderfully portraied by Heino Ferch..“).

1997 was the year of his breakthrough as a film actor with his appearance as Jewish singer Roman Cycowski in The Harmonists (director: Josef Vilsmaier), a famous German a cappella singing ensemble of the early 1930s.

In 1997 he also played the leading part in Winter Sleepers, an early work by director Tom Tykwer (Run Lola Run, The Parfume)

In 1997 Ferch portrayed no less than nine different movie characters. In seven of these he played the leading role or co-lead. (Comedian Harmonists, Winter Sleepers, Life is All You Get, Play for your life, The Guardian Angel, Coma, Buddies, Lucie Aubrac, It happened at broad daylight)

In 1998 he starred as gangster Ronnie in Tom Tykwer`s breakthrough movie Run Lola Run.

In 2001 the TV-mini series The Tunnel (director: Roland Suso Richter) focused on the dramatic escape of 32 persons from the GDR. It received seven film awards and was sold to more than 28 countries. Ferch received the Golden Camera award as best actor for his role as Harry Melchior, a fictional figure based on real-life escapee Hasso Herschel.

In 2004 the film The Downfall (director: Oliver Hirschbiegel) was released. It received an Oscar nomination and was subsequently sold to 145 countries around the world. In this film Ferch played Hitler's architect and Minister for Armaments, Albert Speer.

After the turn of the millennium the German film production company  started a new TV-format: the so-called event movies. Striking events form German history are combined with semi fictional story telling „making the past come alive“ (-claim)  (e.g. The Tunnel, The Airlift, Dresden, Storm Tide). Heino Ferch repeatedly spearheaded this format as featuring lead actor.

In 2005 eight million German viewers watched the TV-event  with Heino Ferch starring as American General Philipp Turner, a fictional character after General William H. Tunner, the organizer of the air-supply bridge in 1948/49 for the locked-in city of Berlin. The film received the Golden Camera award as best TV film of the year and was sold for transmission into 43 countries.

The film aired in 32 countries. Ferch played the title role.

Heino Ferch also appears regularly in leading parts in smaller productions – often high quality thrillers. Most of these received various film awards. (e.g. The lawyer and his guest, The account, Hell in the head, Killing at seaside, Hunt for Justice.)
Now (2013) gets his role in the Italian serie My Heaven Will Wait as Frederick Khoner. 
He also has character parts in European co-productions and in Canada, namely as Lucie Aubrac (directed by Claude Berri), Julius Caesar (directed by Uli Edel), Napoléon (dir.: Yves Simoneau), The Seagull's Laughter (dir: Ágúst Guðmundson),  (dir.: Charles Binamé) The Trojan Horse – H2O Part II (dir: Charles Binamé) and D´Artagnan et les trois Mousquetaires (dir.: Prierre Aknine) helped to establish the German actor's visibility in an international setting.

Ferch also did voice acting, performing the German dubbing voices for Agent Classified (Benedict Cumberbatch) in The Penguins of Madagascar and Ernesto de la Cruz (Benjamin Bratt) in Coco.

Selected filmography

1988:  - Funker
1990:  - Klaus
1991: Who's Afraid of Red, Yellow and Blue - Müller
1991: Death Came As a Friend (TV film) - Korten
1992:  - Representative
1993: Gefährliche Verbindung (TV film) - Andy
1994: Lauras Entscheidung (TV film) - Galreith
1995: Küß mich! - Johannes
1996: The Ogre - SS-Officer Raufeisen
1997: Life Is All You Get - Hoffmann
1997: Lucie Aubrac - Barbie
1997: Winter Sleepers - Marco
1997: The Harmonists - Roman Cycowski
1998: Widows – Erst die Ehe, dann das Vergnügen - Vince Travelli
1998: Four for Venice - Nick
1998: Run Lola Run - Ronnie
1998: Mortal Friends - Max Klausmann
1998: Tower of the Firstborn - Léon
1999: Straight Shooter - Volker Bretz
1999: The Green Desert - Simon
2000: Marlene - Carl Seidlitz
2000: The Unscarred - Johann
2001: Der Tunnel - Harry Melchior
2001: The Seagull's Laughter - Björn Theódór
2002:  - Steffen Hennings
2002: Napoléon (TV miniseries, FR) - Armand de Caulaincourt
2002: Extreme Ops - Mark
2002: Julius Caesar (TV film, USA, IT, FR) - Vercingetorix
2003:  (TV film) - Franz Wolbert
2004: Downfall - Albert Speer
2005:  - Hermes - Aphrodite
2005: D'Artagnan et les trois mousquetaires (TV film, FR) - Athos
2005:  (TV film, CAN) - Keller
2005:  (TV film) - General Philipp Turner
2006: Ghetto - Gens
2006: The Wall – Berlin ´61 (TV film) - Hans Kuhlke
2007:  (TV film) - Heinrich Schliemann
2007: Messy Christmas - Jan Meinhold
2008:  (TV film) - Jürgen Kaiser
2008: The Trojan Horse (TV film, CAN, US) - Christian Kruse
2008: Der Baader Meinhof Komplex - Horst Herold's Assistant
2008:  (TV film) - Manuel Aranda
2009:  (TV film) - Kommissar Thomas Danner
2009:  (TV miniseries) - Gustav Krupp von Bohlen und Halbach
2009: Vision - Mönch Volmar
2010: Jerry Cotton - Klaus Schmidt
2010: Vincent Wants to Sea - Robert
2010: Hanni & Nanni - George Sullivan
2010: Max Schmeling - Max Machon
2010: In the Jungle (TV film) - Henning Lohmann
2010:  - Professor Mohr
since 2011:  (TV series, 9 episodes) - Richard Brock
2012:  (TV film) - Dieter Waldner
2012:  - Ralf Tanner
2012: Hanni & Nanni 2 - George Sullivan
2012:  (TV film) - Moll
2013:  (TV miniseries) - Louis Adlon
2013:  (TV film) - Peter Staude
2013:  (TV film) - Houston Stewart Chamberlain
2014: Sarajevo - Dr. Herbert Sattler
2014: Tigers - Michael
2014: Suite Française - Major
2014: The Penguins of Madagascar - Agent Classified (voice, German version)
2015:  (TV film) - Simon Kessler
2015:  - Dr. Thurisaz
2015: Unterm Radar (TV film) - Heinrich Buch
2016:  - Fritz Lang
2016: Conni & Co - Schuldirektor
2017: Coco - Ernesto de la Cruz (voice, German version)
2018: Hot Dog - Hedmann

Awards
Adolfe Grimme Award
Adolf Grimme Award for series/miniseries (A Light in Dark Places / Das Wunder von Lengede)
Bambi Awards
Bambi Award for national film (Downfall)
Bambi Award for TV event of the year (A Light in Dark Places / Das Wunder von Lengede)
Bavarian Film Awards
1997 Special Award (The Harmonists / Comedian Harmonists)
Bavarian TV Awards
Bavarian TV Award (Der Tunnel)
Golden Camera
Golden Camera (Der Tunnel)
Jupiter Award
Jupiter Award (The Wall - Berlin ´61)

References

External links

 
 Heino Ferch Filmography on www.filmszenen.net
 Scene photos of Heino Ferch in different film roles   from kino.de

1963 births
Living people
People from Bremerhaven
German male television actors
German male film actors
20th-century German male actors
21st-century German male actors
International Emmy Award for Best Actor winners
German polo players